Agha Bozorg mosque ( Masjed-e Āghā Bozorg) is a historical mosque in Kashan, Iran. The mosque was built in the late 18th century by master-mi'mar Ustad Haj Sa'ban-ali. The mosque and theological school (madrasah) is located in the center of the city.

Agha Bozorgh Mosque was constructed for prayers, preaching and teaching sessions held by Molla Mahdi Naraghi II also known as Mulla Mohammad Naraqi, known famously by his title of Āghā Bozorgh (literally meaning big or great lord) given to him by the Shah himself. Molla Mahdi Naraghi II was the son of the legendary Mulla Ahmad Naraqi (also spelled sometimes as Naraghi) who was the second strongest person in Iran after the king himself, Fath-Ali Shah Qajar. Mulla Ahmad Naraqi is well known for rallying the Iranian forces against the Russian invasion of northern Iran and declaring "jihad" or "holy war" against the invading Russians. He was successfully able to reconquer the Iranian lands that the invading Russian forces had captured during that offensive. Mulla Ahmad Naraqi, his brothers, his sons, and his father Mulla Muhammad Mahdi Naraqi famously known as Muhaqqiq Naraqi; are some of the most prominent Shi'a clerics as well as some of the most famous Islamic Iranian scientists of their time. Mulla Ahmad Naraqi and his father Muhaqqiq Naraqi are especially well known and honored to this day in Iran as the leading Islamic leaders of their time. It being the first time in Shi'a Twelver Islam that the helm of leadership of the faith was passed from father to son. Mulla Ahmad Naraqi was so accomplished in jurisprudence at the time of his father's passing (1209 AH/1795 CE) that it was agreed upon in a general consensus by the other leading figures of the time, to have Mulla Ahmad Naraqi as the next leader of the faith. Muhaqqiq Naraqi and Mulla Ahmad Naraqi's status in society at the time as leaders in both politics, jurisprudence, and faith can best be compared to the power and position held by Popes in the Catholic Church. They were in essence the leaders of the entire Twelver Shi'a world. With Mulla Ahmad Naraqi's passing in 1229 AH/1829 CE he was honored by being interred in the Shrine of Ali. His legacy holds as one of the most important and renowned Muslims in the past 1100 years and one of only a handful of Muslims who have been honored throughout history by being laid to rest in the Shrine of Imam Ali.

Specifications
The mosque has been described as "the finest Islamic complex in Kashan and one of the best of the mid-19th century". Noted for its symmetrical design, it consists of two large iwans, one in front of the mihrab and the other by the entrance. The courtyard has a second court in the middle which comprises a garden with trees and a fountain. The iwan in front of mehrab has two minarets with a brick dome. It was here where Ustad Ali Maryam as a pupil started his career as an architect.

Gallery

See also
List of mosques in Iran
Iranian architecture

References

External links

  Agha Bozorg Mosque, photography

18th-century mosques
Madrasas in Iran
Mosques in Isfahan Province
Buildings and structures in Kashan
Tourist attractions in Kashan